Refurbishment may refer to:

Refurbishment (electronics)
Antiques restoration
Automotive restoration

See also 
Conservation and restoration of immovable cultural property
Reconstruction (architecture)
Remanufacturing
Renovation